Buffy the Vampire Slayer: Willow & Tara is a trade paperback anthology collection published by Dark Horse Comics in 2002 and based on the television series Buffy the Vampire Slayer. The volume collects three issues focusing on Willow Rosenberg and Tara Maclay: Buffy the Vampire Slayer: Willow & Tara - Wannablessedbe, originally published in 2001 as a one issue special, and Buffy the Vampire Slayer: Willow & Tara - Wilderness, originally published in 2002 as a two issue limited series. It also adds a story from an "extra" issue.

General description
The book features the one-shot WannaBlessedBe (drawn by Terry Moore and Eric Powell) and the Wilderness story (drawn by AJ), as well as a story from 'Dark Horse Extra' entitled "Demonology Menagerie" (story and art by Andi Watson).

Wannablessedbe
Set in Buffy season 5, the envy of a girl toward Willow and Tara's relationship becomes dangerous to Sunnydale when neither Buffy nor the rest of the gang are available to help the young couple.

Wilderness
Wilderness is set during Buffy season 6, and was previously featured in the Buffy the Vampire Slayer Annual 2004. In the story, Willow, Tara, and Dawn become involved in mystery after coming across a plot of cursed earth near the Pacific Coast Highway. The forest animals are controlled and seem to be killing those who wander too far away from the highway. The girls try to put an end to the force corrupting this natural order. The forest has been the site of a number of killings by creatures great and small. Willow, Tara and Dawn face a new enemy, Greenjack, and hope to leave the forest intact.

Comics based on Buffy the Vampire Slayer
Comics about women
Comic strip duos
2002 comics debuts
Lesbian-related comics